Melody of Love or Melodies of Love may refer to:

Film and television
 The Melody of Love, a 1912 American silent short film
 Melody of Love (1928 film), an American romantic musical film
 Melody of Love (1932 film), a German operetta film directed by Georg Jacoby
 Melody of Love (1952 film), an Italian film
 Melody of Love (TV series), a 2013 South Korean daily drama series

Music
Songs:
 "Melody of Love" (song), composed by Hans Engelmann (1903), lyrics by Tom Glazer (1954); recorded by Billy Vaughn (1955) and others
 "Melodie D'Amour" ("Melody of Love"), a 1957 song by The Ames Brothers
 "My Melody of Love", a 1974 song by Bobby Vinton
 "Melody of Love (Wanna Be Loved)", a 1994 song by Donna Summer
 "Melody of Love", a 2019 song by Hot Chip

Albums:
 Melody Of Love, a 1964 album by The Lennon Sisters
 Melodies of Love, a 1974 album by Bobby Vinton
 The Melody of Love, a 1993 album by Lata Mangeshkar
 Melody of Love, a 2006 album by Tim Miner

See also
 Mélodie d'amour (disambiguation)
 "Chanson D'Amour" ("Song of Love"), a 1958 song written by Wayne Shanklin, covered by several artists